Yana Lantratova (born December 14, 1988, Nizhnyaya Tura) is a Russian political figure and a deputy of the 8th State Duma.
 
From 2006 to 2007, Lantratova worked on TV at MTV, Muz-TV, 5TV. In 2006, she founded and headed the Youth Organization Stars Center, that specialized in the organization of charity performances by popular pop singers in orphanages, hospitals, and boarding schools. In 2009, she was the regional curator of the projects initiated by the Young Guard of United Russia. In 2010, she started working as an assistant to the Member of the Legislative Assembly of Saint Petersburg Vitaly Milonov. In December 2010, she was elected to the federal coordination council of the Young Guard of United Russia. In 2011, she headed the working group of the All-Russia People's Front on detection and suppression of crimes against children, distribution of child pornography and pedophilia on the Internet. From November 2012 to December 2018, she was a Member of the Presidential Council for Civil Society and Human Rights. In November 2015, she was appointed Executive Secretary of the Council. Since September 2021, she has served as deputy of the 8th State Duma.

References
 

 

1988 births
Living people
A Just Russia politicians
21st-century Russian politicians
Eighth convocation members of the State Duma (Russian Federation)
Politicians from Saint Petersburg
21st-century Russian women politicians
Northwestern Management Institute alumni